WHHT (103.7 FM) is a radio station licensed to Cave City, Kentucky, United States, the station serves the Bowling Green area.  The station is owned by Commonwealth Broadcasting through licensee Newberry Broadcasting, Inc.

History
The original station using the call letters WHHT signed on in 1988 at 106.7 FM, with the station logo "Hottest Hits".  Studios were located on Happy Valley Road in Glasgow, Kentucky.  The station played Top-40 contemporary music.  Steve Newberry was General Manager and part owner of the original station, whose first air staff included Duke Ryan, Scott Jackson, Bobby Rambo, Jonathan "Tunes" Taylor, and Jim "The Captain" Kirk (later known as Scotty Matthews on sister station WKNK-FM.)  WHHT was an immediate ratings success, allowing Newberry to expand his radio ownership holdings.  He is now among the premier small-market radio station owners in the U.S., and is an active member of the board of the National Association of Broadcasters, having testified before the U.S. Congress on the issue of royalties and performance rights.  A few years after its inception, WHHT's frequency was changed to 103.7, to facilitate a signal power increase.  The call letters were later migrated to another station which had been acquired by Newberry Broadcasting.

The station currently holding the call letters of WHHT went on the air as WLMK on August 23, 1991. On April 26, 1993, the station changed its call sign to WXPC, on September 1, 1996, to WOVO, on October 23, 1998, to the current WHHT,

On October 22, 2012, the station moved from 106.5 FM to 106.3 FM (with a signal upgrade) and picked up the WOVO callsign and adult contemporary format while the WHHT callsign moved to 103.7 FM Cave City, KY.

On February 20, 2015, the station made the transition to becoming another Nash Icon station, that is not owned and operated by Cumulus Media. For a time, the station also kept its "HOWDY" branding, and was branded as "103.7 Nash Icon Howdy FM".

Former on-air staff
Alan "Agent 69" Sledge
Donna "The Hose" Dennis (1980-1986)
Renaldo Mcnutty (1981-1992)
Renato Debenidictus (1999-1999)
Ron "The Tank" Thopson (1985-1999)
Jake Johnson (1981-1984)
Leroy McCain (Unknown)
Barbara Likis (1988-2001)
Mike Hunt (1993-1997)
Jon Overton (1986-1990)
Jimmy Michaels (1977-1991)
George "The Wild Man" Miller (1972–present)

Previous logo

References

External links

Country radio stations in the United States
Radio stations established in 1988
HHT